is a Japanese politician from the Constitutional Democratic Party of Japan. He serves as member of the House of Councillors as a national proportional representative.

References

1956 births
Living people
People from Yanagawa, Fukuoka
Politicians from Fukuoka Prefecture
Hosei University alumni
Members of the House of Councillors (Japan)
Constitutional Democratic Party of Japan politicians
Democratic Party of Japan politicians